Coventry City Police was a police force in the city of Coventry, then in Warwickshire, England, from 1836–1969.

History 

The force was created under powers conferred to the City by the Municipal Corporations Act of 1835, and was overseen by the local watch committee.

In 1965, Coventry's Chief Constable Edward Pendleton predicted:

Using powers created by the Police Act 1964, the then Home Secretary decided in 1966 to merge the city force with that of the county, the Warwickshire Police as the Warwickshire and Coventry Constabulary. This took effect in 1969. From 1 April 1974, Coventry's police were transferred to the newly formed West Midlands Police.

Chief Constables

References 

Defunct police forces of England
1836 establishments in England
1969 disestablishments in England
Antecedents of the West Midlands Police
Organisations based in Coventry